Intervista (English: Interview) is a 1987 Italian film directed by Federico Fellini.

Plot
Interviewed by a Japanese TV crew for a news report on his latest film, Fellini takes the viewer behind the scenes at Cinecittà. A nighttime set is prepared for a sequence that Fellini defines as “the prisoner’s dream” in which his hands grope for a way out of a dark tunnel. With advancing age and weight, Fellini is finding it difficult to escape by simply flying away, but when he does, he contemplates Cinecittà from a great height.
 
The next morning, Fellini accompanies the Japanese TV crew on a brief tour of the studios. As they walk past absurd TV commercials in production, Fellini's casting director presents him with four young actors she's found to interpret Karl Rossmann, the leading role in the maestro's film version of Kafka's Amerika. Fellini introduces the Japanese to the female custodian of Cinecittà (Nadia Ottaviani) but she succeeds in putting off the interview by disappearing into the deserted backlot of Studio 5 to gather dandelions to make herbal tea. Meanwhile, Fellini's assistant director (Maurizio Mein) is on location with other crew members at the Casa del Passeggero, a once cheap hotel now converted into a drugstore. Fellini wants to include it in his film about the first time he visited Cinecittà as a journalist in 1938 during the Fascist era. Past and present intermingle as Fellini interacts with his younger self played by aspiring actor, Sergio Rubini. After the crew reconstruct the facade of the Casa del Passeggero elsewhere in Rome, a fake tramway takes young Fellini/Rubini from America's Far West with Indian warriors on a clifftop to a herd of wild elephants off the coast of Ethiopia. Arriving at Cinecittà, he sets off to interview matinee idol, Greta Gonda.

Seamlessly, the illusion takes over the realities of moviemaking as the viewer is thrown into two feature films being directed by tyrannical directors. But only for a short while; for the rest of the film, Fellini and his assistant director (Maurizio Mein) scramble to recruit the right cast and build the sets for the film version of Amerika, a fictitious adaptation that Fellini uses as a pretext to shoot his film-in-progress. This allows Fellini/Rubini to go back and forth in time to experience filmmaking first-hand including disgruntled actors who failed their auditions, Marcello Mastroianni in a TV commercial as Mandrake the Magician, a bomb threat, a visit to Anita Ekberg’s house where she and Mastroianni re-live their La Dolce Vita scenes, screen tests of Kafka’s Brunelda caressed in a bathtub by two young men, and an inconvenient thunderstorm that heralds the production collapse of Amerika with an attack by bogus Indians on horseback wielding television antennae as spears.

Back inside Studio 5 at Cinecittà, Intervista concludes with Fellini’s voiceover, “So the movie should end here. Actually, it’s finished.” In response to producers unhappy with his gloomy endings, the Maestro ironically offers them a ray of sunshine by lighting an arc lamp.

Cast

Main
 Federico Fellini as himself
 Sergio Rubini as Young Fellini / Himself
 Antonella Ponziani as Train Girl / Herself
 Maurizio Mein as himself
 Paola Liguori as Star
 Lara Wendel as Bride
 Antonio Cantafora as Spouse
 Nadia Ottaviani as Vestal Virgin
 Anita Ekberg as herself
 Marcello Mastroianni as himself

Supporting
 Maria Teresa Battaglia as Recruited Actress at Train Station
 Christian Borromeo as Christian
 Roberta Carlucci as Recruited Actress in the Subway
 Umberto Conte as Photographer
 Lionello Pio Di Savoia as Aurelio
 Germana Dominici as No Nudity Actress 
 Adriana Facchetti as Star's Assistant
 Ettore Geri as Menicuccio
 Eva Grimaldi as Actress at Audition
 Alessandro Marino as Cinecittà Director #1
 Armando Marra as Cinecittà Director #2
 Mario Miyakawa as Japanese Reporter
 Francesca Reggiani as Secretary
 Patrizia Sacchi as Make-up Artist
 Faustone Signoretti as Cinecittà Gate Guard
 Rolando De Santis as Chiodo

Cameo/Uncredited
 Tonino Delli Colli as himself
 Federico Fellini as himself
 Gino Millozza as himself
 Danilo Donati as himself
 Delia D'Alberti as Script Girl
 Stefano Corsi as Assistant Director
 Sophie Hicks as Androgenic Actress / Herself
 Roberto Ceccacci as Production Assistant
 Piero Vivaldi as Fellini's Driver 
 Clarita Gatto as "Fellinian" Woman
 Domiziano Arcangeli as Extra

Structure 
Blurring the line between documentary and fiction, Intervista threads four films into one or a film-within-four-films:

Film 1 is a television news report: Japanese journalists arrive on the set to interview Fellini and his crew preparing sets, location scouting, searching for actors, inspecting photographs, and shooting screen tests. Fellini, Anita Ekberg and Marcello Mastroianni appear as themselves.

Film 2 is filmed autobiography: while interviewed by the Japanese, Fellini evokes memories (real or invented) of his first visit to Cinecittà in 1938 as a young journalist commissioned to interview a female matinee idol.

Film 3 is the making of a non-existent movie at Cinecittà, an adaptation of Kafka's Amerika.

Film 4 is the movie itself: Intervista subsumes all three films, making them cohere into the Maestro’s portrait of himself and cinema.

Reception
The film has a 75% approval rating on Rotten Tomatoes, based on 12 reviews with an average rating of 6.9/10. The film ranked 2nd on Cahiers du Cinéma's Top 10 Films of the Year List in 1987.

Awards 
 40th Anniversary Prize at the 1987 Cannes Film Festival
 15th Moscow International Film Festival: Golden Prize

References

Citations
 Burke, Frank and Marguerite R. Waller (2002). Federico Fellini: Contemporary Perspectives. Toronto: Toronto University Press.
 Ciment, Gilles (ed.)(1988). Positif. Paris: Editions Rivages.
 Fellini, Federico (1987). Intervista. Paris: Flammarion.

External links 
 
 

1987 films
Films directed by Federico Fellini
Italian documentary films
1980s Italian-language films
Films about actors
Films about film directors and producers
Films about filmmaking
Films with screenplays by Federico Fellini
Films scored by Nicola Piovani
1980s Italian films